Anthonomus morticinus is a weevil native to Brazil. Its host plant is Solanum mauritianum Scopoli and it is being considered as a potential biocontrol agent for this plant in South Africa.

References 

Curculioninae
Arthropods of Brazil